Thanet District Council is the local authority for the Thanet District in Kent, England. The council is elected every four years.

Political control
The first election to the council was held in 1973, initially operating as a shadow authority before coming into its powers on 1 April 1974. Political control of the council since 1973 has been held by the following parties:

Leadership
The leaders of the council since 1999 have been:

Council elections
Thanet District Council election, 1973
Thanet District Council election, 1976
Thanet District Council election, 1979 (New ward boundaries)
Thanet District Council election, 1983
Thanet District Council election, 1987
Thanet District Council election, 1991
Thanet District Council election, 1995
Thanet District Council election, 1999
Thanet District Council election, 2003 (New ward boundaries increased the number of seats by 2)
Thanet District Council election, 2007
2011 Thanet District Council election
2015 Thanet District Council election
2019 Thanet District Council election

May 2019 election results
 UKIP formed a majority then split into groups
 The Conservative party then became the largest party on the council
 The Labour party became the second largest party on the council. 
 Labour gained the most seats in Thanet over any council area in the country.

May 2015 election results
 The UK Independence Party won control of the council with 33 seats. The Conservative Party won 18 seats, the Labour Party won 4 seats, and one Independent was elected.
 Five UKIP councillors defected to a Democratic Independent Group over September and October 2015 over allegations that the leader of the council prevented the reopening of Manston Airport. This led to UKIP losing a majority on the council. On 5 November, it was reported that a Councillor had defected from UKIP to the Conservatives. In January 2016 UKIP remain the largest group but now with 26 members; there are 19 Conservatives, 5 Democratic Independent Group councillors, 5 Labour and 1 Independent councillor.
 UKIP regained control of the council in 2016, after some independents rejoined the party and following a by-election gain by UKIP from Labour.
 On 21 July 2017, a UKIP councillor defected to the Conservatives, meaning UKIP lost its majority on the council.

May 2011 election results
 Overall turnout: 42%
 The council went to no overall control, the Conservative Party leading a minority administration with 27 seats, the Labour Party taking 26 seats and the Independents 3 seats.
 A Conservative councillor defected to the Independents in December 2011, subsequently the Labour Party led a minority administration.

May 2007 election results
 Overall turnout: 35%.
 The Conservative Party held control of Thanet District Council with 33 seats, the Labour Party took 19 seats.  There were 3 independents and 1 candidate from Ramsgate First also elected.
 The Ramsgate First candidate defected to the Conservatives shortly after the election.

May 2003 election results
 Overall turnout: 33%
 The Conservative Party won control of Thanet District Council with a total of 31 seats, the Labour Party taking 23 seats. One Liberal Democrat candidate and one Independent candidate were elected.
 After the 30 October 2003 by-election the composition was: Conservative Party 30 seats, Labour Party 24 seats.

May 1999 election results
 Overall turnout: 28.9%
 Labour maintained control of Thanet District Council with a total of 35 seats, the Conservatives recovered to 16 seats, the Liberal Democrat candidates were wiped out and 3 Independent candidate were elected.

May 1995 election results
 Overall turnout: 40.2%
 The Labour Party won control of Thanet District Council with a total of 45 seats, the Conservatives were reduced to 3 seats and 4 Liberal Democrat candidates and 2 Independent candidate were elected.

May 1991 election results
 Overall turnout: 41.5%
 The Conservative Party retook control of Thanet District Council with a total of 29 seats, the Labour Party taking 14 seats, 2 Liberal Democrat candidate and 9 Independent candidate were elected.

May 1987 election results
 Overall turnout: 44.8%
 The Conservative Party lost enough seats to lose the council to No Overall Control (NOC). Conservatives had 25 seats, the Labour Party took 7 seats, 10 Liberal/SDP  and 12 Independent candidates were elected.

May 1983 election results
 Overall turnout: 44.1%
 The Conservative Party lost seats but continued in control of Thanet District Council with a total of 28 seats, the Labour Party took 8 seats, 2 Liberal/SDP candidate and 16 Independent candidates elected.

May 1979 election results
 Overall turnout: 71.1% (the election coincided with the General Election.
 The Conservative Party continued to control the Council with a total of 32 seats, the Labour Party reduced to 5 seats, one Liberal candidate and 16 Independent candidates were elected.

May 1976 election results
 Overall turnout: 47.7%
 The Conservative Party kept control of Thanet District Council with a total of 39 seats, the Labour Party taking 11 seats and 13 Independent candidate were elected.

May 1973 election results
 The council was created from Margate Municipal Borough, Ramsgate Municipal Borough, Broadstairs & St Peters Urban District and parts of Eatry Rural District.
 Overall turnout: 44.2%
 The Conservative Party won control of Thanet District Council with a total of 33 seats, the Labour Party taking 14 seats, Liberals 5 seats, and there was eleven Independent candidates elected.

County result maps

By-election results

1995–1999

1999–2003

2003–2007

2007–2011

2015-2019

2019-2023

References

External links
Thanet District Council
 By-election results

 
Council elections in Kent
District council elections in England